Georges Motase Bokwé (born 14 July 1989) is a Cameroonian footballer who plays as a goalkeeper.

Club career
On 23 March 2017, Bokwe signed a one-year contract with Mjøndalen IF from Coton Sport FC, extending his contract with Mjøndalen until 2020 on 25 May 2017. In March 2019 he broke his leg in a friendly match for Mjøndalen, and never returned to play for the Norwegian club.

In 2022 he returned to play for a nearby club, fifth-tier Åssiden.

International career
Bokwé won an unofficial cap at the 2014 Central African Games, playing against Central African Republic. He was a part of the international squad in 2017 who won the 2017 African Cup of Nations in Gabon. He is also a part of the international squad for the 2017 FIFA Confederations Cup.

Honours

Cameroon
 Africa Cup of Nations: 2017

References

External links

1989 births
Living people
Cameroonian footballers
Association football goalkeepers
New Star de Douala players
Coton Sport FC de Garoua players
Norwegian First Division players
Mjøndalen IF players
2017 Africa Cup of Nations players
2017 FIFA Confederations Cup players
Africa Cup of Nations-winning players
Cameroonian expatriate footballers
Expatriate footballers in Norway
Cameroonian expatriate sportspeople in Norway